The Trade Union International of Agroalimentary, Food, Commerce, Textile and Allied Industries (UISTAACT) is one of ten Trade Union Internationals of the World Federation of Trade Unions (WFTU).

History 
The union was formed in 1997 by the merger of the Trade Union International of Agricultural, Forestry and Plantation Workers, Trade Union International of Food, Tobacco, Hotel and Allied Industries Workers, Trade Union International of Workers in Commerce, Trade Union International of Textile, Leather and Fur Workers Unions. All of these TUIs were founded in 1949, except the Commerce Workers which was founded in 1959.

References 

TUI of Agriculture, Food, Commerce, Textile and Allied Industries
Trade unions established in 1997